The Journal for the Academic Study of Magic (JSM) was the journal of the Society for the Academic Study of Magic (SASM), a multidisciplinary group formed in 2002 by Alison Butler and Dave Evans of the University of Bristol. The group was composed of scholars studying all aspects of magic and esotericism.

Published annually by Mandrake of Oxford, JSM ran for five issues, from 2003 to 2008. It contained topical articles, news, and book reviews, and is indexed and/or abstracted in several scholarly databases, including Academic Search Complete, Biography Index, Social Sciences Abstracts, Social Sciences Index, and Social Sciences Full Text.

References
Notes

Citations

Academic organisations based in the United Kingdom
Organizations established in 2002
2002 establishments in England
Academic studies of ritual and magic